Statistics of Swedish football Division 3 for the 1929–30 season.

League standings

Uppsvenska 1929–30

Östsvenska 1929–30

Mellansvenska 1929–30

Nordvästra 1929–30

Södra Mellansvenska 1929–30

Sydöstra 1929–30

Västsvenska 1929–30

Sydsvenska 1929–30

Footnotes

References 

Swedish Football Division 3 seasons
3
Sweden